The Cup of Football Federation of USSR was the official name for a short-lived premier Soviet football (soccer) competition similar to the USSR Cup that exclusively featured Soviet Top League competitors. For short it was called the "Federation's Cup".

Overview
The first experience of the League Cup in the USSR can be considered All-Union Committee of Physical Culture and Sports Tournament in 1952. Initially planned earlier in 1940 as an elimination tournament of the groups A and B teams, the actual tournament took place already after the World War II. The USSR Federation Cup was comparable to the English League Cup which allows only clubs from the FA Premier League and The Football League. The competition was disbanded upon the break-up of the Soviet Union and in 1991 was not conducted as by the end of the season the Soviet Union fell apart. The Federation's Cup lasted for five years from 1986 through 1990 and basically served as an extension of the football season after the league's reduction from 18 to 16 participants following 1986. Its first edition consisted of a brief calendar and most of its participants played three games. The following editions had their calendar extended to double this by splitting it where the early stage would start in spring and then qualified teams would continue to compete playing in fall. The competition was a mix of a league format and a straight elimination cup-like format at later stages. After 1987 the league format was conducted in spring, while the best two teams from each group would qualify to quarterfinals which would start sometime in fall. The last edition (in 1990) was cut short substantially as a lot of participants did not only quit this competition, but also would withdraw out of the Football Federation of the Soviet Union.

Ukrainian clubs have the largest number of cups won with three, Russia and Kazakhstan have one each. Dnipro Dnipropetrovsk is the only club to win the cup twice.

All-Union Committee Cup
 1940 All-Union Committee of Physical Culture and Sports Cup (cancelled)
 1952 All-Union Committee of Physical Culture and Sports Tournament

Other Football Federation cups
 1965 Football Federation and Komsomol Cup
 1967 Podsnezhnik tournament
 1968 Podsnezhnik tournament
 1969 Podsnezhnik tournament
 1977 Football Federation and Sovetskiy Sport Cup

Football Federation Cup Finals

References

Notelist

External links
 USSR Federation Cup, klisf.info. Accessed on June 9, 2006.

 
Federation Cup
Soviet Union
Cup
1986 establishments in the Soviet Union
1990 disestablishments in the Soviet Union